Magnus II may refer to:

 Magnus II of Norway (1048–1069), son of Harald Sigurdsson
 Magnus II of the Isle of Man was Magnus III of Norway (1073 – 24 August 1103)
 Magnus II of Sweden, King of Sweden between 1160 and 1161
 Magnus II, Earl of Orkney (ca. 1184–1239)
 Magnus II, Duke of Brunswick (ca. 1328–1373), called Magnus with the necklace
 Magnus IV of Sweden (Magnus Ericsson, sometimes numbered Magnus II) (1316–1374)
 Magnus II, Duke of Mecklenburg (1441–1503), son of Heinrich IV, Duke of Mecklenburg-Schwerin
 Magnus II, Duke of Saxe-Lauenburg (1543 – 14 May 1603)